Disparago is a genus of flowering plants in the  family Asteraceae.

 Species
All the species are endemic to the Cape Province region of South Africa
 Disparago anomala Schltr. ex Levyns 
 Disparago ericoides (P.J.Bergius) Gaertn.
 Disparago kraussii Sch.Bip.
 Disparago laxifolia DC.

References

Gnaphalieae
Asteraceae genera
Endemic flora of South Africa